South Circular Road may refer to:

South Circular Road, London, a road in South London, also known as the A205
South Circular Road, Dublin, a road in southern Dublin, also known as the R811
South Circular Road, Limerick